Laelida alboochracea is a species of beetle in the family Cerambycidae. It was described by Karl-Ernst Hüdepohl in 1998. It is known from Borneo and Malaysia.

References

Lamiini
Beetles described in 1998